Balkan Samba Records is a record label in Evanston, Illinois founded by multi-instrumentalist and composer Howard Levy.

The label was founded by Levy in 2004 as a way for him to record and publish previously unpublished works of his own music and that of his associates and friends, such as Chicago Symphony violinist Fox Fehling; the Latin jazz group Chévere de Chicago, Howard Levy's Acoustic Express; guitarist Norman Savitt, and an instructional DVD ''Harmonica Out of the Box, Vol. 1".

See also
 List of record labels

References

External links
 Official site

American record labels
Jazz record labels
Record labels established in 2004